Henry Robinson Towne (August 24, 1844 – October 15, 1924) was an American mechanical engineer and businessman, known as an early systematizer of management. He  donated over 2 million dollars to philanthropy at his death, in 1924.

Biography
Towne was born in Philadelphia in 1844 to John Henry and Maria (Tevis) T. Towne.  He attended the University of Pennsylvania from 1861 to 1862, where he was a member of St. Anthony Hall, but did not complete a degree.  The university later awarded him an honorary master's degree.

Early career
Following his year of college, Towne found work as a draftsman at the Port Richmond Iron Works, which was owned by I. P. Morris, Towne & Co.  In 1863, Towne was put in charge of repair work for the union gunboat Massachusetts.  During 1864-1866, Towne was placed in charge of erecting engines in monitors for the United States Navy. After the war, Towne went to Paris and studied physics at the Sorbonne.  When he returned, he found employment with the firm of William Sellers & Co., in Philadelphia.

Yale Lock Manufacturing

In the summer of 1868, Henry R. Towne was introduced to Linus Yale Jr. by a mutual friend. Towne was, by this time, looking for a new business opportunity and had become impressed about the possibilities of Yale's new "cylinder" lock.  In October 1868, the two men formed the Yale Lock Manufacturing Company, to be located in Stamford, Connecticut. Towne provided new capital and management of the firm, and Yale the invention. Yale died later in 1868, and Towne reorganized the company as Yale & Towne Manufacturing Co.  Towne stepped down as chairman in 1915.

Within this time-frame he developed the Towne-Halsey plan. According to F.W. Taylor and mentioned in his book Scientific Management "it consists in recording the quickest time in which a job has been done, and fixing this as a standard. If the workman succeeds in doing the job in a shorter time, he is still paid his same wages per hour for the time he works on the job, and in addition is given a premium for having worked faster, consisting of from one-quarter to one-half the difference between the wages earned and the wages originally paid when the job was done in standard time."

Later years
Towne was one of the first engineers to see management as a new social role for engineers and that the development of management techniques was important for the development of the engineering profession.  He laid out his ideas about the management role for the engineer in his "The Engineer as Economist."  He was elected President of the ASME in 1888, and his presidential address continued to address how to improve shop and worker efficiency (see "Gain-Sharing").

Towne and Link-Belt president James Mapes Dodge were responsible for maneuvering Frederick Winslow Taylor to the Presidency of the ASME in 1906 (Noble, ABD, 269-270).

Death
Henry R. Towne died in New York City on October 15, 1924. His wife Cora E. White, whom he had married in 1868, died in 1917. In his will, Towne bequeathed over two million dollars to the establishment of the Museums of the Peaceful Arts in Manhattan.

Selected publications
 Towne, Henry Robinson. Locks and Builders Hardware: A Hand Book for Architects. J. Wiley & Sons, 1904.
 Towne, Henry R. "Foreword to Shop Management." Frederick Taylor, Scientific Management: 5-6. 1911.

Articles, a selection:
 Towne, Henry R. "A Drawing Office System." Transactions of the American Society of Mechanical Engineers 5 (1884): 193-205.
 Towne, Henry R.  "Engineer as an Economist," Transactions of the American Society of Mechanical Engineers 7 (1886), 425ff.
 Towne, Henry R.  "Gain-Sharing," Transactions of the American Society of Mechanical Engineers 10 (1889), 600ff.
 Towne, Henry R. "President's Address, 1889." Transactions of the American Society of Mechanical Engineers 11 (1889): 50-71.
 Towne, Henry R. "Industrial engineering." Ingeniería Industrial), discurso pronunciado en la Universidad de Purdue el 24 (1905).
 Towne, Henry Robinson. "Axioms Concerning Manufacturing Costs." Trans. A SM E 34 (1912).
 Towne, Henry R. "The General Principles of Organization Applied to an Individual Manufacturing Establishment," Transactions, Efficiency Society Incorporated. v.1 1912, p. 77-83

Patents 
 1897. US patents 575016 - Frictional controlling device for screw hoist.
 1898. US patents 29786 - design for a key

References

External links 

Biographical Sketch

1844 births
1924 deaths
American business theorists
American mechanical engineers
Presidents of the American Society of Mechanical Engineers
University of Pennsylvania alumni
People from Philadelphia